North Medford High School is a public high school in Medford, Oregon, United States. It is part of Medford School District, and its nickname is the Black Tornado. The school enrolls 1,750 students.

History 
Originally the City of Medford had a single high school, Medford High School, constructed in the 1920s. In the 1960s, the school district expanded, constructing a new high school on the opposite side of the city. Rather than develop this into an independent school, the district kept Medford High School as the lone school, with students attending at the two different locations. The current campus of NMHS was the newly constructed "Medford Senior High School", with grades 11 and 12 attending while grades 9 and 10 went to Medford Mid High School, which later became South Medford High School (SMHS) and ultimately Central Medford High School. (SMHS has since moved into a new building). This was set in place to primarily to allow Medford to compete athletically with larger school districts such as Portland Public Schools of Portland. At this time the city would have been placed in smaller athletic (then 2A) divisions if the district would have been divided into two secondary schools.

During the 1960s and 70s, Medford commonly put forth many state championship athletic teams in the Oregon then 3A division. However, in 1986, Medford High School was finally split into the two current high schools. Both now house around 2,000 students, similar to the number of students Medford High School collectively held in the 1970s and 1980s.

North Medford's current principal is Allen Barber.

Campus development
North Medford was built in 1967 and has been remodeled and has had additions added starting in 1973 through 1981 and again in 1992. In 2007, the City of Medford passed a bond for district wide school renovations, including a complete renovation of North Medford with remodeled auditorium, administrative space, and a new library. The project was completed in early 2011.

The school campus includes  of occupied building space with 64 classrooms, and is located on a large  campus, most of which is used for sports and recreation. Both North and South Medford High School share a common football stadium, Spiegelberg Stadium.

Academics

Graduation Rates per School Year

Four-year Cohort Total is determined by the number of students initially in that class. Four-year Cohort Adjusted is representative of those students that did not transfer out of state, country, to private or homeschooling, or otherwise are deceased.

Awards
North Medford consistently places highly among schools in contention for the OSAA's Oregonian Cup, a trophy awarded each year to the school that best exemplifies excellence in academics, activities, and athletics. The school ranked in the top 10 annually from the 2002-2003 school year to the 2008-2009 school year, winning the trophy in 2003-2004.

The school was also recognized in 2000 by the Grammy Foundation for excellence in music education, being named a Grammy Signature School.

Sports
The North Medford Black Tornado participate in Oregon's 6A Southwest Conference. The school's colors are red and black. Prior to Oregon's shift from four classification level to six levels, North Medford was part of the Southern Oregon Conference (SOC) at level 4A.

State championships
Team Championships

Athletes from North Medford have won many individual state championships as well, with most in the era of the 1940s through the 1970s.

Notable alumni
 Brad Arnsberg, former baseball player, New York Yankees and Texas Rangers; earned the save for Nolan Ryan's 300th career win; pitching coach for Florida Marlins when they won 2003 World Series
 Bill Bowerman, founder of Nike, Inc., former University of Oregon track coach
 Seth Brown, baseball player for the Oakland Athletics
 Tracey Eaton, professional football player for Houston Oilers, Tennessee Titans, Atlanta Falcons
 Dick Fosbury, athlete, high jump, inventor of Fosbury Flop, and Olympic gold medalist
 Page Hamilton, founder/guitarist of band Helmet
 Marshall Holman, professional bowler
 Jon Lindstrom, actor, writer, and musician
 Danny Miles, hall of fame basketball coach
 Kellin Quinn, lead singer of rock band Sleeping With Sirens
 Lisa Rinna, actress, talk show host, reality TV personality
 Braden Shipley, baseball player, pitcher for Arizona Diamondbacks
 Kevin Towers, general manager of San Diego Padres 1995-2009, Arizona Diamondbacks 2010-2014
 Bob Wolcott, former baseball player
Dan Arthur, National Radio Host

References 

High schools in Jackson County, Oregon
Education in Medford, Oregon
Educational institutions established in 1966
Public high schools in Oregon
1966 establishments in Oregon